Oncotylus punctiger is a species of plant bugs belonging to the family Miridae, subfamily Phylinae that is endemic to Spain.

References

Insects described in 1894
Endemic fauna of Spain
Hemiptera of Europe
Phylini